Boris Igor González Garrido (born May 22, 1980) is a Chilean footballer, who plays right midfield. He made his professional debut with Chilean club Rangers where he spent his first two seasons. The next four seasons he would spend with Cobreloa, where he would win three championships. He currently plays for Curicó Unido.

Honours

Club
Cobreloa
 Primera División de Chile (3): 2003 Apertura, 2003 Clausura, 2004 Clausura
Colo-Colo
 Primera División de Chile (2): 2007 Apertura, 2007 Clausura

References

1980 births
Living people
Chilean footballers
Association football midfielders
Rangers de Talca footballers
Cobreloa footballers
Colo-Colo footballers
C.D. Antofagasta footballers
Club Deportivo Universidad Católica footballers
Chile international footballers
People from Talca